David Morales (born September 16, 1998) is an American politician and activist. He is the state representative in the Rhode Island House of Representatives for the 7th district. A member of the Democratic Party, Morales took office in January 2021 with support from the Democratic Socialists of America, the Working Families Party, the Sunrise Movement, and other progressive organizations. At 22, he is currently the youngest member of the Rhode Island State Legislature and is the youngest Latino state lawmaker in the country.

In the 2021 legislative session, Morales was a member of the House Innovation, Internet and Technology Committee, and the House Municipal Government and Housing Committee. He is also a member of the National Association of Latino Elected Officials (NALEO) and the Democratic Socialists of America (DSA). During the 2021 legislative session, Morales introduced a total of 27 bills and resolutions, ranging from healthcare, COVID relief, labor rights, immigration, and tax reform.

Political Positions
Morales identifies as a Democratic socialist, and is a close ally of Rhode Island state senator Sam Bell.

Tax policy

Morales is a proponent for reforming Rhode Island's tax code to reduce exemptions for private universities and nonprofits, such as Brown University, as well as increasing state income tax-rates for wealthy people in the top income bracket. He has regularly spoken out against Rhode Island’s tax code, which was changed in 2006 to cut income taxes for the highest income earners from 9.99% to 5.99%. In the fall of 2020, shortly after winning his primary election, he resisted Governor Gina Raimondo’s “austerity budget” alongside Reclaim RI and other legislators, which would have cut social services while preserving tax cuts for the wealthy.

During the 2021 legislative session, he introduced a bill to establish a surtax on the business corporation tax for publicly traded corporations whose CEO to median worker pay ratio is equal to or greater than 100 to 1. Alongside Deputy House Speaker Charlene Lima, Rep. Morales also co-sponsored a bill to exempt the first $10,200 of a person’s unemployment benefits from state taxes in response to Rhode Island’s decision to tax unemployment.

Labor
Morales is a supporter of raising the minimum wage to $15 an hour. In May 2021, the RI House of Representatives passed a pathway to the $15 minimum wage which will gradually increase the minimum wage from its current $11.50 an hour to $15 by January 1, 2025.

In the 2021 legislative session, Morales introduced several bills related to labor rights. Among them was House Bill 5855 which would expand Rhode Island’s whistleblower protection law by prohibiting an employer from reporting an employee's immigration, extending whistleblower protections to job applicants and prospective employees, increasing damages for employers who violate the law from “actual” to “treble”, and requiring a posting of the Whistleblower Protection Law, in every language known to be spoken by the workers, in the workplace. The bill passed both the House and Senate Chamber during the last day of the 2021 legislative session. In addition, he introduced a bill to provide essential workers with “hazard pay” which would be a rate of 133% of their regular pay during a declared public health emergency. He also introduced the Dignity at Work Act which would require employers to take appropriate steps to prevent workplace bullying or harassment and establish a Fair Work Commission (FWC) to investigate cases of workplace bullying. Both bills were held for further study.

Healthcare
Morales is a strong supporter of a single-payer healthcare system. He introduced a bill to establish a Medicare-for-All healthcare program for Rhode Island called “the Rhode Island Comprehensive Health Insurance Program.” The bill was held for further study. Morales worked with state lawmakers and co-sponsored legislation to cap out of pocket costs for insulin prescriptions at $40 a month; the bill unanimously passed both the House and Senate. He also introduced a bill to cap out of pocket expenses for specialty prescription drug medication at $100 for a 30 day supply.

Health Insurance
In August 2021, Morales organized a letter along with 14 other lawmakers and over 150 Rhode Island residents urging the RI Office of the Health Insurance Commissioner to reject health insurance rate hikes proposed by Blue Cross Blue Shield, the Neighborhood Health Plan of RI, UnitedHealthcare, Aetna, Cigna and Tufts Health.

Morales believes that RIte Track, a Rhode Island statewide Medicaid program, should provide healthcare coverage to all children, regardless of their immigration status. In one interview, Morales stated, "Right now, we have 3,000 children in the state uninsured and the vast majority are low income or undocumented." With recent budget cuts and the growing number of uninsured people of Rhode Island and the exclusion of undocumented children, Morales hopes to revamp the program.

COVID-19 
In 2021, Morales introduced and passed House Bill 6208 which limits the amount insurance companies can charge customers for out-of-pocket costs relating to COVID-19. It also mandates that COVID-19 testing and vaccination be free for Rhode Island residents. Morales has publicly criticized Rhode Island leaders and government officials for their slow response to COVID-19, citing their behaviors as careless. He advocates for a bill that would provide hazard pay to individuals working during the pandemic, including supermarket workers and restaurant servers. Morales also introduced a bill to impose a moratorium on utility shut-offs during COVID-19, as well as during any future public health crises. Furthermore, he has advocated for investing in communities of color and low-income communities that have been disproportionately affected by COVID due to pre-existing social inequities, stating we cannot continue “business as usual.”

Education 
To further expand access to higher education, Morales introduced a bill to allow high school students that earn Rhode Island’s Silver or Gold Seal of Biliteracy to earn college credit toward a minor or major at a public university or community college.

Policing 
Following New York City Police Department’s use of a robot dog across Manhattan, Morales introduced a bill to prevent the potential use of police robot dogs in Rhode Island. The bill was held for further study.

Environment 
Before becoming a legislator, Morales was a member of Sunrise RI. He has maintained his advocacy work throughout his term. In April 2021, he organized a letter with over 25 legislators to oppose Sea 3’s fossil fuel expansion in the Port of Providence. During the 2021 legislative session, Morales introduced a bill to transfer the planning and administration of the interconnection of renewable energy from the electric distribution companies to the Rhode Island Infrastructure Bank. He was also the lead sponsor on a bill to establish the first Green Justice Zone in the state which would ensure that all burdened communities throughout the state have clean air and clean water.

Personal life
Morales grew up in the rural, working-class town of Soledad, California. He was raised by a single mother who often worked multiple jobs at once to support him and his younger sister, including working as gas station clerk and picking vegetables in agricultural fields. Morales has regularly cited his mother as his greatest inspiration for becoming politically involved, both praising her perseverance and wanting to change the conditions of poverty which he saw her experience. Morales also considers Senator Bernie Sanders’ 2016 presidential campaign along with his involvement in the Sunrise Movement and the Democratic Socialists of America as his inspirations for pursuing public office.

Throughout high school, Morales engaged in farm labor on the weekends to support his family and enrolled in college courses at night, enabling him to gain enough credits to graduate from a 4-year college at 19. He received his bachelor’s degree in urban studies from the University of California, Irvine. He then pursued a Master’s of Public Affairs at Brown University, where at 20, he became the youngest graduate in the program’s history.

2020 Election 
Morales began his campaign against incumbent Daniel P. McKiernan in December 2019. Despite not receiving the local Democratic committee’s endorsement, he won a three-way primary with 49.4% of the vote. He then received 96% of the vote in the general election.

See also
Rhode Island House of Representatives
Democratic Socialists of America

References

Hispanic and Latino American state legislators in Rhode Island
Democratic Party members of the Rhode Island House of Representatives
Democratic Socialists of America politicians from Rhode Island
Rhode Island socialists
1998 births
Living people